Sian McLaren (born 25 September 1991) is an Australian soccer player who played for Adelaide United and for Sydney FC in the Australian W-League and for Sydney Uni SFC in the Australian Women's Premier League.

Early life
Born in Scotland, Fryer-McLaren's family moved to Australia when she was five years old. Her family all supported Rangers.

Playing career
Initially playing as a striker, she switched to playing as a goalkeeper during the under-14 national championships, when her state's team did not have an available goalkeeper. While playing at Sturt-Marion, Fryer-McLaren was backup goalkeeper for Leanne Trimboli.

Fryer-McLaren departed Adelaide United ahead of the 2021–22 A-League Women season.

References

1991 births
Living people
Australian women's soccer players
Adelaide United FC (A-League Women) players
Sydney FC (A-League Women) players
A-League Women players
Women's association football goalkeepers
Footballers from Falkirk